Stachys bullata is a species of flowering plant in the mint family known by the common name California hedgenettle.

Distribution
It is endemic to California, where it is known from the Central Coast Ranges, the Transverse Ranges, and other coastal mountain ranges in the central and southern parts of the state. It can also be found in maritime coastal habitat, such as the canyons of the Channel Islands.

Description
This mint produces an erect stem up to about 80 centimeters tall. It is coated in rough and soft hairs, some glandular. The hairy, glandular leaves are up to 18 centimeters long, borne in opposite pairs along the stem. The hairy, glandular inflorescence is made up of interrupted clusters of six flowers each. The flower has a tubular pink corolla up to a centimeter long borne in a hairy calyx of sepals.

References

External links
Jepson Manual Treatment of Stachys bullata
Stachys bullata — Photo gallery

bullata
Endemic flora of California
Natural history of the California chaparral and woodlands
Natural history of the California Coast Ranges
Natural history of the Channel Islands of California
Natural history of the Peninsular Ranges
Natural history of the San Francisco Bay Area
Natural history of the Santa Monica Mountains
Natural history of the Transverse Ranges
Flora without expected TNC conservation status